Deputy pantler (Polish: podstoli) was a court office in Poland and Lithuania. They were the deputy of a pantler, and was responsible for the King's pantry.

From the 14th century, this was an honorary court title and a district office in Crown of Poland and Grand Duchy of Lithuania, and later in Polish–Lithuanian Commonwealth.

 Podstoli wielki koronny - Crown Great Deputy Master of the Pantry
 Podstoli wielki litewski - Lithuanian Great Deputy Master of the Pantry 
 Podstoli koronny - Crown Deputy Master of the Pantry
 Podstoli litewski - Lithuanian Deputy Master of the Pantry 
 Podstoli nadworny koronny - Crown Deputy Court Master of the Pantry 
 Podstoli nadworny litewski - Lithuanian Deputy Court Master of the Pantry 
 Podstoli ziemski - District Master of the Pantry

See also
 Pan Podstoli, a novel by Ignacy Krasicki
Stavilac

Polish titles
Lithuanian titles